SS Stalingrad was a steamship of the Soviet Union, named after the Soviet city of Stalingrad, itself named after Joseph Stalin. She was built at Soviet Shipyard No. 189 (Ordzhonikidze) in Leningrad and operated by Chief Directorate of the Northern Sea Route (GUSMP), who homeported her in Vladivostok. She had entered service in 1933.

Career and sinking
Stalingrad was one of ten Anadyr-class cargo-passenger ships built for ice navigation in the Far East, around the port of Vladivostok. They had the unofficial name of "far-easterners". They were initially designed to be powered by diesel but were redesigned as coal powered steamers for economic reasons. Vladivostok did not have large oil stores and had to import most of its supplies, but coal was cheap and widely available in the region.

During the Second World War, Stalingrad was used in the Atlantic and Arctic Oceans to transport supplies from the United Kingdom to Russia. In September 1942, she was part of Convoy PQ 18, which left the Tyne on 2 September bound for North Russia via Reykjavík. Stalingrad was one of six Soviet merchants, and was carrying a cargo of munitions.

The convoy came under attack from the Luftwaffe and U-boats. Stalingrad was hit by one torpedo and then suffered a boiler explosion. The other two torpedoes missed, but one of them hit another ship of the convoy, which had to steer hard left to avoid the torpedoed Stalingrad.

Stalingrad had been hit amidships on her starboard side on one of her coal bunkers. She sank in just three minutes and 48 seconds. The crew members and passengers had to abandon ship in the port lifeboats because the starboard ones had been destroyed by the explosion. Further losses occurred when one of the boats capsized when it reached the water. Out of a complement of 87, 21 were killed, with 66 survivors being picked up by other ships of the convoy.

References

External links 
Convoy web

Ships sunk by German submarines in World War II
Steamships
1933 ships
World War II shipwrecks in the Arctic Ocean
Maritime incidents in September 1942
Ships built in the Soviet Union
Merchant ships of the Soviet Union
Ships built at the Baltic Shipyard